Khaveh or Khaweh may refer to:

Khaveh, Markazi
Khaveh, Qom
Khaveh, Tehran